Neocollyris albitarsis is species of ground beetle in the genus Neocollyris in the family Carabidae. It was described by Wilhelm Ferdinand Erichson in 1834.

References

Albitarsis, Neocollyris
Beetles described in 1834